Suisun City (Wintun for "where the west wind blows") is a city in Solano County, California, United States. The population was 29,518 at the 2020 census. The city takes its name from the adjacent Suisun Bay, which in turn is named for the Suisun people, an indigenous Native American tribe of the area.

Etymology
Suisun City is named for the Suisun people, which is a Native-American tribe living in the area.

Geography
Suisun City is located at  (38.244863, -122.017048).

The city is adjacent to Suisun Marsh, at  the largest contiguous estuarine marsh remaining on the west coast of North America.

Climate
According to the Köppen Climate Classification system, Suisun City has a warm-summer Mediterranean climate, abbreviated "Csb" on climate maps.

Demographics

2010
The 2010 United States Census reported that Suisun City had a population of 28,111. The racial makeup of Suisun City was 10,805 (38.4%) White, 5,713 (20.3%) African American, 196 (0.7%) Native American, 5,348 (19.0%) Asian, 340 (1.2%) Pacific Islander, 2,898 (10.3%) from other races, and 2,811 (10.0%) from two or more races. Hispanic or Latino of any race were 6,753 persons (24.0%).

The Census reported that 28,067 people (99.8% of the population) lived in households, 27 (0.1%) lived in non-institutionalized group quarters, and 17 (0.1%) were institutionalized.

There were 8,918 households, of which 4,013 (45.0%) had children under the age of 18 living in them, 4,856 (54.5%) were opposite-sex married couples living together, 1,482 (16.6%) had a female householder with no husband present, 624 (7.0%) had a male householder with no wife present. There were 596 (6.7%) unmarried opposite-sex partnerships, and 66 (0.7%) same-sex married couples or partnerships. 1,443 households (16.2%) were made up of individuals, and 350 (3.9%) had someone living alone who was 65 years of age or older. The average household size was 3.15. There were 6,962 families (78.1% of all households); the average family size was 3.52.

7,737 people (27.5%) were under the age of 18, 2,950 people (10.5%) aged 18 to 24, 7,850 people (27.9%) aged 25 to 44, 7,418 people (26.4%) aged 45 to 64, and 2,156 people (7.7%) who were 65 years of age or older. The median age was 33.0 years. For every 100 females, there were 96.9 males.  For every 100 females age 18 and over, there were 92.9 males.

The homeowner vacancy rate was 3.0%; the rental vacancy rate was 5.9%.  19,372 people (68.9% of the population) lived in owner-occupied housing units and 8,695 people (30.9%) lived in rental housing units.

2000
At the 2000 census, there are 26,118 people, 7,987 households and 6,445 families residing in the city. The population density was 2,514.8/km (6,510.9/mi2). There were 8,146 housing units at an average density of 784.3/km (2,030.7/mi2). The racial makeup of the city was 44.44% White, 19.31% African American, 0.72% Native American, 17.69% Asian, 1.03% Pacific Islander, 8.52% from other races, and 8.29% from two or more races. 17.81% of the population were Hispanic or Latino of any race.

There were 7,987 households, of which 47.8% had children under the age of 18, 62.4% were married couples living together, 13.1% had a female householder with no husband present, and 19.3% were non-families. 14.3% of all households were made up of individuals, and 3.0% had someone living alone who was 65 years of age or older. The average household size was 3.26 and the average family size was 3.59.

32.5% of the population were under the age of 18, 8.9% from 18 to 24, 32.5% from 25 to 44, 20.3% from 45 to 64, and 5.7% who were 65 years of age or older. The median age was 32 years. For every 100 females, there were 98.1 males. For every 100 females age 18 and over, there were 95.1 males.

The median household income was $60,848 and the median family income was $63,616. Males had a median income of $41,253 versus $31,301 for females. The per capita income for the city was $20,386. About 4.6% of families and 6.5% of the population were below the poverty line, including 8.1% of those under age 18 and 6.1% of those age 65 or over.

Education
Schools in Fairfield and Suisun are operated by the Fairfield-Suisun Unified School District.

Schools
Suisun Elementary School
Crescent Elementary School
Crystal Middle School
Dan O Root II Elementary School

High schools
Armijo High School
Fairfield High School
Rodriguez High School

History

Suisun City was established in the 1850s. Its location made it ideal for commerce and transportation during the California Gold Rush.

In 1868—1869, it was connected to the First transcontinental railroad at Sacramento via the California Pacific Railroad (Cal-P) main line, expanding the region's reach across the United States.  By 1879 Central Pacific Railroad owned the Cal-P mainline and rerouted the transcontinental overland route through the new branch from Port Costa, via the railroad ferry Solano to Benicia, across the Suisun Marsh to Suisun City, putting the region directly on the overland route from San Francisco to Ogden and beyond.

In the 1960s and 1970s, Suisun City experienced rapid growth as the San Francisco Bay Area's suburban ring expanded to the formerly rural Solano County. Also in the 1960s, Interstate 80 was constructed two miles (3 km) outside the city, effectively moving commercial traffic away from railways and water conveyance.

Transportation

Fairfield and Suisun Transit
Suisun/Fairfield Amtrak station

Gallery

Sister cities
Naguilian, La Union, Philippines

References

External links
 

1868 establishments in California
Cities in Solano County, California
Cities in the San Francisco Bay Area
Incorporated cities and towns in California
Populated places established in 1868
California placenames of Native American origin